The Presbyterian Church in Korea (HapDongChungYun) was separated from the JongHap Presbyterian Church in 1976. In 1984 it united with the HapDongHyunHap. It has 58,317 members in 386 churches served by 148 pastors in 2004. It subscribes the Apostles Creed and Westminster Confession.

References 

Presbyterian denominations in Asia
Presbyterian denominations in South Korea